The Housing and Community Development Act of 1987, P.L. 100-242, 101 Stat. 1815, is a United States federal law which amended the Housing and Community Development Act laws with regards to the Housing Act of 1937. The amendments revised sections of the Act concerning community and neighborhood development, family and single housing, and preservation for low income home owners. The law provided insurance for FHA Home Equity Conversion Mortgages (HECM) better known as a home equity conversion loan or reverse mortgage.

Title VI of the Act established the Nehemiah Housing Opportunity Grants ("NHOP") program, intended to encourage homeownership by making federal grants to nonprofit organizations who would, in turn, loan funds to low-income families purchasing homes being built or rehabilitated under an approved program.  NHOP ceased operation in 1991 when it was repealed by section 289 of the Cranston-Gonzalez National Affordable Housing Act of 1990 (42 USC 12839).

The S. 825 legislation was passed by the 100th U.S. Congressional session and signed into law by the 40th President of the United States Ronald Reagan on February 5, 1988.

See also
 Housing and Community Development Act of 1977
 Housing and Community Development Act of 1992

External links

1988 in law
100th United States Congress
United States federal housing legislation
Mortgage industry of the United States
Community development
Urban economics
Urban politics in the United States
1988 in the United States